Riebiņi Municipality is a former municipality in Latgale, Latvia. The municipality was formed in 2004 by merging Galēni Parish, Riebiņi Parish, Rušona Parish, Silajāņi Parish, Sīļukalns Parish and Stabulnieki Parish, the administrative centre being Riebiņi. The population in 2020 was 4,513.

On 1 July 2021, Riebiņi Municipality ceased to exist and its territory was merged into Preiļi Municipality.

See also 
 Administrative divisions of Latvia

References

External links 
 

 
Former municipalities of Latvia
Latgale